Qusqu (Quechua for boundary stone; nucleus; navel; heap of earth and stones; bed, dry bed of a lake, Hispanicized spelling Josjo) is a mountain in the Chunta mountain range in the Andes of Peru, about  high. It is located in the Huancavelica Region, Castrovirreyna Province, Castrovirreyna District, and in the Huancavelica Province, Ascensión District.

The little lake northeast of Qusqu is named Yawriqucha ("needle lake", Hispanicized Yauricocha). This is where the Yawriqucha River originates. Its waters flow to the Mantaro River in the northeast.

References

Mountains of Huancavelica Region
Mountains of Peru